The Mongolian First League (also known as the Khurkhree National First League for sponsorship reasons) is the second-highest division of Mongolian football leagues.

Foundation
The Mongolia First League was founded in 2015 by the Mongolian Football Federation.

The league started with the name Khurkhree First League, including the reference to the sponsor in the name, and the first edition was made up of the Continental FC team.

Stadium
Previously all First League matches were played at the MFF Football Centre. As of the 2022 season, some matches are now also played at the Khan-Uul Stadium.

Champions
2015 – Continental FC
2016 – Goyo FC
2017 – Arvis FC
2018– Ulaanbaataryn Mazaalaynuud FC
2019 – Gepro FC
2020 – BCH Lions
2021 – Khovd FC
2021/23: Khoromkhon FC
2022/23:

References

2015 establishments in Mongolia
Football competitions in Mongolia
Second level football leagues in Asia